Colburn Park is a ballpark located in Newark, New York, USA. It is home to the Newark Pilots (2011-present) of the Perfect Game Collegiate Baseball League and was the home for the Newark Co-Pilots (1968-1979) and Newark Orioles (1983-1987) of the New York–Penn League, the Newark Barge Bandits (1995-1996) of the North Atlantic League and the Newark Raptors (1998-2005) of the New York Collegiate Baseball League. It opened in 1968 and seats 2,000 people.

References

Baseball venues in New York (state)
Sports venues in Wayne County, New York
1968 establishments in New York (state)
Sports venues completed in 1968